Otto J. Wolff served as acting United States Secretary of Commerce in the administration of President Barack Obama. Wolff previously served under President George W. Bush as the chief financial officer of the Department of Commerce, overseeing its $5.6 billion budget.

References

United States Department of Commerce officials
Year of birth missing (living people)
Living people
American chief financial officers
Obama administration cabinet members